The Indigetes (Latin: indigetes or indigetae or Indiketes) were an ancient Iberian (Pre-Roman) people of the eastern side of the Iberian peninsula (the Roman Hispania). They are believed to have spoken the Iberian language.

They occupied the far north east area of the Iberian Peninsula known as Hispania Tarraconensis, in the gulf of Empúries and Rhoda, stretching up into the Pyrenees though the regions of Empordà, Selva and perhaps as far as Gironès, where the Ausetani could be found who were related ethnically.

They were divided into four tribes, and the main towns they centered on were: Indika (only mentioned by Stephanus of Byzantium, still unidentified, but he was possibly referring to Empúries or Ullastret),  Empodrae (Empúries, where there was an extremely important  Greek, Phocaean and Massaliotan colony, which had their corresponding commercial “emporio”), Rhoda (Roses), Juncaria (La Jonquera), Cinniana (Cervià) and Deciana (close to La Jonquera). This land was watered by the Clodianus (Fluvià), the Sambrocas (Muga) and the Tichis (Ter). This district in the Gulf of Empúrias was known as Juncaris Campus.

The Indigetes minted their own coins which bore the inscription undikesken in northeastern Iberian script that is interpreted in Iberian language as a self-reference to the ethnic name of that people: from the Indigetes or from those of undika.

In 218 BC they were conquered by Rome during the Roman conquest of Hispania. In 195 BC they rebelled; the consul Marcus Porcius Cato quashed the rebellion.

The main archaeological sites for the Indigetes are in Ullastret (Baix Empordà), Castell de la Fosca (Palamós, Baix Empordà) and Puig Castellet (Lloret de Mar, Selva).

Gallery

See also
Iberians
Pre-Roman peoples of the Iberian Peninsula

Notes

References

External links

Detailed map of the Pre-Roman Peoples of Iberia (around 200 BC)

Pre-Roman peoples of the Iberian Peninsula
History of Catalonia
Ancient peoples of Spain
Tribes conquered by Rome